William Samuel Forrester (born 29 June 2001) is an English professional footballer who plays as a defender for  club Port Vale. He made his professional debut at Stoke City in May 2021, and spent time on loan at Mansfield Town, before signing with Port Vale in July 2022.

Career

Stoke City
Forrester was born in Alsager and joined at the Stoke City academy age of six. He progressed through the youth teams at Stoke, and made his senior debut on 9 October 2018, playing for the U21s in the EFL Trophy against Morecambe. Forrester made his professional debut on 8 May 2021, scoring the opening goal on the final day of the 2020–21 season in a 2–0 away win against AFC Bournemouth in the Championship. On 31 August 2021, Forrester joined League Two side Mansfield Town on loan until January 2022. Forrester's time at Field Mill was hampered by an ankle injury which restricted him to seven appearances. Despite this, manager Nigel Clough still asked Stoke to extend the loan until the end of the campaign. After returning to Stoke, Forrester made three first-team appearances at the end of the 2021–22 season. Manager Michael O'Neill praised his composure on the ball and patience for waiting for game time in April 2022. However Forrester was sold just three months later, and O'Neill explained that it was because he refused to sign a long-term contract and the club already had 20-year old centre-back Connor Taylor who also needed game time to develop.

Port Vale
On 26 July 2022, Forrester joined League One side Port Vale for an undisclosed fee. It was the first transfer between Stoke and Vale since 1978. He started the 2022–23 season playing on the right of a back three, though also impressed playing in the centre of the three. He was voted as Player of the Match for his performance in a 2–1 win at Derby County on 8 October, and went on to win the club's Player of the Month award. He was again voted as the club's Player of the Month for February, having featured in six of Vale's seven games, and admitted it was tough to experience a large amount of games in a condensed period of time for the first time in his career.

Style of play
Forrester is a versatile defender equally adept at playing as a centre-back, left-back or right-back.

Career statistics

References

2001 births
Living people
People from Alsager
English footballers
Association football defenders
Stoke City F.C. players
Mansfield Town F.C. players
Port Vale F.C. players
English Football League players